Old Fannegusha Creek is a stream in Holmes County the U.S. state of Mississippi. It is a tributary to Tchula Lake.

Fannegusha is a name derived from the Choctaw language purported to mean "tasty squirrel". Variant names for Fannegusha Creek are "Foney Bush Creek", "Funnegusha Creek", and "Funnigusha Creek".

References

Rivers of Mississippi
Rivers of Holmes County, Mississippi
Mississippi placenames of Native American origin